is a Japanese actor, voice actor and comedian. His most famous role is as the titular character of the anime series Lupin the Third. He inherited the role from Yasuo Yamada after the latter's death in 1995, and his first role as Lupin was in the theatrical film Farewell to Nostradamus.

Impression repertoire
Aki Yashiro
Eiko Segawa
Hiromi Go
Keisuke Kuwata
Masakazu Tamura
Yasuo Yamada (Arsène Lupin III)

Filmography

Television animation
Lupin the 3rd: The Pursuit of Harimao's Treasure (1995), Arsène Lupin III
Lupin the 3rd: The Secret of Twilight Gemini (1996), Arsène Lupin III
Lupin the 3rd: Island of Assassins (1997), Arsène Lupin III
Lupin the 3rd: Crisis in Tokyo (1998), Arsène Lupin III
Lupin the 3rd: The Columbus Files (1999), Arsène Lupin III
Lupin the 3rd: Missed by a Dollar (2000), Arsène Lupin III
Lupin the 3rd: Alcatraz Connection (2001), Arsène Lupin III
Lupin the 3rd: Episode 0: The First Contact (2002), Arsène Lupin III
Lupin the 3rd: Operation Return the Treasure (2003), Arsène Lupin III
Lupin the 3rd: Stolen Lupin (2004), Arsène Lupin III
Lupin the 3rd: Angel Tactics (2005), Arsène Lupin III
Lupin the 3rd: Seven Days Rhapsody (2006), Arsène Lupin III
Lupin the 3rd: Elusiveness of the Fog (2007), Arsène Lupin III
Lupin the 3rd: Sweet Lost Night (2008), Arsène Lupin III
Lupin the 3rd vs. Detective Conan (2009), Arsène Lupin III
Lupin the 3rd: The Last Job (2010), Arsène Lupin III
Lupin the 3rd: Blood Seal of the Eternal Mermaid (2011), Arsène Lupin III
Lupin the Third: The Woman Called Fujiko Mine (2012), Arsène Lupin III
Lupin the 3rd: Record of Observations of the East - Another Page (2012), Arsène Lupin III
Lupin the 3rd: Princess of the Breeze - Hidden City in the Sky (2013), Arsène Lupin III
Lupin the 3rd Part IV: The Italian Adventure (2015), Arsène Lupin III
Lupin the 3rd: Italian Game (2016), Arsène Lupin III
Lupin the 3rd Part V: Misadventures in France (2018), Arsène Lupin III
Lupin the 3rd: Goodbye Partner (2019), Arsène Lupin III
Lupin the 3rd: Prison of the Past (2019), Arsène Lupin III
Lupin the 3rd Part 6 (2021–22), Arsène Lupin III

Theatrical animation
Lupin III: Farewell to Nostradamus (1995), Arsène Lupin III
Lupin III: Dead or Alive (1996), Arsène Lupin III
Lupin the 3rd vs. Detective Conan: The Movie (2013), Arsène Lupin III
Lupin the Third: Jigen's Gravestone (2014), Arsène Lupin III
Lupin the Third: Goemon's Blood Spray (2017), Arsène Lupin III
Lupin the Third: Fujiko's Lie (2019), Arsène Lupin III
Lupin III: The First (2019), Arsène Lupin III

Original net animation (ONA)
Lupin the 3rd vs. Cat's Eye (2023), Arsène Lupin III

Original video animation (OVA)
Lupin III: Return of Pycal (2002), Arsène Lupin III
Lupin III: Green Vs. Red (2008), Arsène Lupin III
Lupin Family Lineup (2012), Arsène Lupin III
Lupin Shanshei (2012), Arsène Lupin III
Is Lupin Still Burning? (2018), Arsène Lupin III

Video games
Lupin the 3rd: The Castle of Cagliostro: Reunion (1997), Arsène Lupin III
Lupin the 3rd: The Sage of Pyramid (1998), Arsène Lupin III
Lupin the 3rd: Treasure of the Sorcerer King (2002), Arsène Lupin III
Lupin the 3rd: Lost Treasure Under the Sea (2003), Arsène Lupin III
Lupin the 3rd: The Legacy of Columbus's Inheritance (2004), Arsène Lupin III
Lupin the 3rd: Lupin is dead, Zenigata is in love (2007), Arsène Lupin III
Lupin the 3rd: The Greatest Brain Battle in History (2010), Arsène Lupin III

Dubbing
Burn Notice, Michael Westen (Jeffrey Donovan)

References

External links
Official blog 
Official agency profile 

1958 births
Living people
Japanese impressionists (entertainers)
Japanese male video game actors
Japanese male voice actors
Lupin the Third
Male voice actors from Tokyo
20th-century Japanese male actors
21st-century Japanese male actors